Oh! is the second studio album by the South Korean girl group Girls' Generation. It was released on January 28, 2010 in Korea.  It features the title track "Oh!". A repackaged version, Run Devil Run was released in March 2010, with new track "Run Devil Run" as the title track.

The album was listed by Gaon Albums Chart as the second best-selling release of 2010 in South Korea, with 197,934 copies sold, with the repackaged version at fourth with 136,851 copies.

History
Initial interest in the album was high, as physical and online pre-orders of the album totaled 150,000 copies.  On its first day of sale, Oh! sold 30,000 copies. The album was released internationally via iTunes on February 8, 2010.<ref> [http://star.mt.co.kr/stview.php?no=2010020908313947290&type=&SVEC 소녀시대, '오!'로 전세계 공략 나선다 (SNSD, taking the whole world by storm with "Oh!")]. Star News. February 9, 2010. Retrieved February 9, 2010.</ref>

The group began promoting their album on MBC's Music Core on January 30. The group also performed "Show! Show! Show!" as a part of their special comeback performance on Music Core and SBS's Inkigayo.

Upon the album's full release, various album tracks charted in the top ten of various charts.

In April 2010, one of the songs in their album entitled, "영원히 너와 꿈꾸고 싶다 (Forever)" has been featured on the OST of the drama Pasta.

Repackaging release
A "repackaged" version of the album was released in March, with a new concept based around a "Dark Girls' Generation" theme.  The new single "Run Devil Run" was released as a digital single on March 17, 2010.  A demo, guide version of the song was originally recorded by Kesha; however, the song's rights were then sold to SM Entertainment, and subsequently assigned to Girls' Generation.  The music video was released on March 18, with their first comeback performance on KBS's Music Bank. Baek, Ki-hye. `블랙소시` 베일 벗은 소녀시대, 신곡 음원 공개 (Veil is Removed from "Black Girls' Generation", New Single Released) . Korea Economic Daily. March 17, 2010. Retrieved March 16, 2010.

S.M. Entertainment later stated that Yoona was the girl on the cover.

Promotion
"Oh!" was first performed live on January 30, 2010 on MBC's Music Core, as part of their "comeback stage". They also performed "Show! Show! Show!" However, there was a technical error in MBC's broadcast, with a few seconds of dead air near the end of the performance; the network was subsequently flooded with complaints. The incident was then parodied on YouTube, mixing in clips of the Korean drama IRIS, receiving attention from Korean netizens. The group followed up with their second performance on The Music Trend the following day.

Starting from March 11, 2010, photos of the members were released online showcasing a dark concept, so called Black SoShi.  In the run of promotions for the song, an official iPhone application was released, available in free and paid versions. The free version has 30-second previews for all the songs on the album, a music video for “Run Devil Run” and a few photographs. The paid version has full tracks for all the songs on the album, music videos for “Run Devil Run”, “Gee”, “Oh!” and “Tell Me Your Wish (Genie)”, and a photo gallery. They concluded their song promotions by the May 2, 2010 in SBS' Inkigayo.

They promoted the album with the tour Girls' Generation Tour, started on July 23, 2011 in Olympic Fencing Gymnasium, Seoul, South Korea, ended in Impact Arena, Bangkok, Thailand on February 12, 2012.

Singles
Kenzie, a songwriter who previously composed the group's debut single "Into the New World", also composed "Oh!". "Oh!" was released to digital music sites on January 25, 2010. The song quickly topped various digital music charts within 10 minutes of release. Moreover, the song reached #1 on Gaon Music Chart

"Run Devil Run" was written by American songwriters, Alex James and Busbee, with Swedish songwriter Kalle Engström. The song was first recorded by American singer-songwriter Ke$ha in 2008 while pre-production of her debut album, Animal was occurring. However, Ke$ha never included the song on the album. The song remained untouched for the next two years until executives at Universal Music Group sold the rights of the song to SM Entertainment, after this, Korean songwriter Hong Ji-yoo was brought on to translate and rearrange the English version of the song into Korean.  Its first #1 on network television was on KBS's Music Bank, where it won over Kara's "Lupin" and 2AM's "Jalmothaesseo" (I Did Wrong). Moreover, "Run Devil Run" was ranked #1 at South Korean Gaon Music Chart for two weeks.Lucia Hong: Girls' Generation triumphs on Gaon music charts . 10asia.co.kr. April 1, 2010. Retrieved July 19, 2010

 Other charted songs 
All of the songs from Oh!'' appeared on the Gaon Digital Chart.

The track "Star Star Star" sold 1,480,417 digital copies, while the song "Show Show Show" sold 1,020,710 digital copies in 2010.

Track listing

Charts

Weekly charts

Year-end charts

Sales 

Notes

Release history

References

External links
 

2010 albums
Albums produced by Lee Soo-man
Girls' Generation albums
Grand Prize Golden Disc Award-winning albums
Korean-language albums
SM Entertainment albums